Hedong Subdistrict is a subdistrict in Qingyuan District, Ji'an, Jiangxi province, China. , it has 8 residential communities and 11 villages under its administration.

See also 
 List of township-level divisions of Jiangxi

References 

Township-level divisions of Jiangxi
Ji'an